The Ethiopian Empire was dominated by the barter system (traditionally composed of Arab Muslim and Ethiopian Muslim caravans), and a strong trade culture nourished the business within the feudal system. In medieval times, Harar became the spot of commerce which imports and exports bypassed through the port of Zeila, operated by Muslim merchants, delivering commodities to the highland inhabitants through Aliyu Amba, which connected Shewa and Arsi provinces.

Starting during the reign of Emperor Menelik II, modernized banking institutions and currency was introduced, including the Maria Theresa thaler in 1890 and Ethiopia's own currency minted in Harar in 1892, but the barter system continued into the early 20th century until the Italian occupation in 1936. The first national bank, the Bank of Abyssinia, was established by fifty years concession from National Bank of Egypt in 1905, and served as a monopoly. In 1932, by compensation of Emperor Haile Selassie, the bank was renamed "Bank of Ethiopia".

After the occupation of Ethiopia by Italy, the National Economic Council embarked on a state development plan in 1954/55, consisting of a policy-making body headed by Emperor Haile Selassie to improve agriculture and industry productivity, literacy and well-being, and standard of life. The First Five-Year Plan (1957–1961), Second Five-Year Plan (1962–67) and Third Five-Year Plan (1968–73) projected to develop agro-industry and manufacturing sectors and employ skilled manpower in the country. Between 1960 and 1970, Ethiopia enjoyed an annual 4.4% growth rate in per capita GDP and overall gross domestic product (GDP). There was an increase of manufacturing growth rate from 1.9% in 1960/61 to 4.4% in 1973/74, with wholesale, retail trade, transportation, and communication sectors increased from 9.5% to 15.6%.

Feudalism and peasantry

Feudalism was a central tenet in the economic aspect of Ethiopia since the imperial regime, where peasants were always positioned in the lowest social order. Scholars classified the Ethiopian dominion in terms of the geographical and cultural sphere of the Amhara and Tigre people in the northern provinces of Ethiopia whose conquest based on freehold patterns of the southern regions. Ethiopian peasants produced and depended on various economic activities such as taxation, marketing infrastructure and agrarian production. Their dependent households and communities were visible to the wider social system in reciprocity among kinship and associational groupings, and by collection and redistribution of taxes, tribute, and political and religious leaders and marketing goods and services in barter and cash economies.

The pioneer of analysis of the premodern economic history of Ethiopia, Richard Pankhurst, published a full-length book titled An Introduction to the Economic History of Ethiopia from Early Times to 1800 in 1961 from available published sources in 1800, which was attributed to Encyclopedia Aethiopica. However, in 1972, Taddesse Tamrat also contributed to hagiographies and land charters as well as trade routes and the gult system of land tenure in medieval Ethiopia. Scholars of Ethiopian studies argued that peasants were greatly affected by continual extreme natural and human-made danger, such as looting, diseases and famine, pest infestations, seasonal fluctuations of rivers and streams, and soil erosion in highland areas. During early Ethiopian expansion, highland places such as Wag and Lasta, and through Shewa across the Great Rift Valley were the spot of political, cultural and economic agglomeration.

Harar

Medieval Harar was home to a concentrated bureaucratic commercial system with goods and merchandises imported from and through the Zeila and Barbara routes. Zeila was bounded by Somali Eesa territory whereas Barbara ran through mountains of the Nole tribe.

Most goods were consumed in Harar or sold by Harari merchants sent to the interior of Ethiopia, especially to Shewa and Arsi Province. Those routes linked at Aliyu Amba, to connect Shewa and Harar. Foreign citizens were also involved in local business, mostly Armenians, Greeks, Indians, Syrians, Italians and several Egyptians engaged in selling cotton, cloth, clothing, glassware, brass and copper, drinks and preserves. During the Egyptian occupation of Harar (1874–1885), there were "3,000 Amhara Christians, 5,000 Somali Muslims, a handful of Arab, Turkish, Greek, Indian, Syrian, Italian and Armenian traders, and French missionaries all living among 25,000 Harari Muslims". This representation continued even during the reign of Haile Selassie for "every race and creed seemed to be represented here."

Trade items 

Principal trading commodities of the Ethiopian Empire included coffee, tobacco and sunflower, with 200–300 tons per year. Khat with a market price of quarter rupees per parcel was another commodity, largely produced or exported to Aden. Locally produced woven clothing, earrings, bracelets, wax, butter, honey, mules, sorghum, wheat karanji (a bread used by travellers), ghee and all kinds of tallow were imported to Harar and exported to other parts of the world. Other monopolized items like ivory, ostrich feathers and musk were also exported.

19th and early 20th century

Trade was carried out on the barter system partly with the aid of "primitive money" and currency of various kinds. Commerce was traditionally based on two institutions: the local market found in every village (between peasants and local producers) and caravans of Arab and Ethiopian Muslims (typically long-distance trade). The caravans operated in a well established pattern; large merchants who would make long journeys announced their day of departure. They usually embarked on their journey at dawn and halted for water and pasture.

According to Henry Salt, Tigre people sold wrought iron to make ploughshares and other articles, cattle, equines, skins, corn, cotton, butter, onions, and baskets of red peppers. Shops were not available in Adwa and Gondar. Trade routes between Gondar and Massawa were very inconvenient for caravans, often taking five months, while unencumbered travellers sometimes easily undertook for twenty years. Muslims monopolized the trading system in line with an advantage to Christians, controlling much of Red Sea and the Gulf of Aden ports through Arabia, and in Sudan, trade routes were filled with discrimination wherein merchants were seized as slaves on some occasions.

Menelik II

The Ethiopian Empire was modernized by economic structure under the reign of Emperor Menelik II, whose power flourished as Negus of Shewa. Several changes occurred, including the introduction of Maria Theresa thalers from Austria in the early twentieth century, the use of Harar currency, and minting of coins by the emperor in the 1890s, replacing the barter system. However, resistance emerged from central and southern provinces.

Bank of Abyssinia concession
By early 1875, Pierre Arnoux advised Menelik II to create Ethiopia's own currency. Around 1900, Frenchman M. Delharbe proposed the first bank, which Menelik rejected due to French influence. In May 1903, John Lane Harrington, the plenipotentiary to Ethiopia, supported Menelik's desire and asked him not to reject Whitehall's interest to formulate a proposal. In December 1904, the Foreign Office of Ethiopia approached the governor of the National Bank of Egypt to inquireabout undertaking a venture. The bank's governor, Sir Elwin Palmer, replied:
I have the honor to inform you than the National Bank of Egypt is prepared to send duly authorized agent to Addis Abbaba [sic] to study the question on the spot, and to negotiate details. Our agent could start as early as Sir J. Harrington, His Majesty's Agent at Addis Abbaba, should think it advisable.On 10 March 1905, Menelik granted a fifty year concession from the National Bank of Egypt to establish a monopolized bank called the Bank of Abyssinia to lodge all government public funds, issue loans, print banknotes, and mint coins in addition to other privileges. As the banking request of Menelik was presented to British authorities in May 1903, France, Britain and Italy, which dominated interests in the Horn of Africa, placed restrictions in Ethiopia's interest while maintaining their own interest, culminating in the Tripartite Treaty, signed in December 1906. 

The British undue authority seemed to have appeared in early stages of the planning, which was supported by economist Gebrehiwot Baykedagn, but Harrington feared the concession would create political weight to the French railway. The Bank was established in 1905 with capital of 1 million shillings. According to the agreement, the bank could engage commercial business (selling shares, accepting deposits, and effecting payments in cheques) and issue banknotes. Shortly, the bank ensued its expansion of branches, opening to Harar, Dire Dawa, Gore and Dembidolo with agencies in Gambela and a transit office in Djibouti. The bank was later closed by the order of Emperor Haile Selassie, who paid compensation to its shareholders, and replaced by the Bank of Ethiopia in 1932, fully owned by the Ethiopian government, with its capital of 750,000 pound sterling. It was established in accord with the Egyptian decree of 30 May 1905.

Haile Selassie 
Under Haile Selassie's rule, agriculture was the primary activity in Ethiopia, consisting mostly of coffee production, with a feudal system that relied on inequitable land ownership. The majority of the population was expected to till the fields belonging to wealthy landowners. At this time, industrialization was not fully developed. For instance, the Dutch sugar company, H.V.A, which began its operation in Ethiopia in the 1950s, employed 70% of the Ethiopian workforce involved in the food-processing sector; in turn, the food processing sector employed 37% of workers in manufacturing and industry.

In 1954/55, the government created the National Economic Council for state development plans. It was a policy-making body headed by the Emperor to improve agriculture and industry productivity, literacy and well-being, and standards of living. The First Five-Year Plan (1957–1961) sought to develop strong transportation, construction and communications interlinked to other regions. Another goal was to create a framework of skilled or semiskilled labor in the industries to reduce import dependency in Ethiopia. The last plan was to promote agricultural development through ventures.  

The Second Five-Year Plan (1962–67) envisaged its economy with agro-industry, with objectives including diversification over the next twenty years. The Third Five-Year Plan (1968–73) postulated facilitation of economic well being by raising manufacturing and agro-industrial performance. The First Five-Year Plan took a total investment of about 839.6 million birr, 25% above the planned 674 million birr, the Second Five-Year Plan was 13% higher than the planned 1,694 million birr and  the Third Five-Year Plan was estimated to be 3,115 million birr. There were numerous restraints other than from deficient national development management affecting the Planning Commission (which prepared the first and second plan) and the Ministry of Planning (the third).

Many project managers failed to achieve the objective as a result of lack of resources (personnel, equipment and finds) to continue large scale economic development during the first plan, hampering the growth of national product (GNP). The export rate at 3.7% increased at a 3.2% annual rate as opposed to projected 3.7%, which hindered a requirement for the national target of economic sectors such as agriculture, manufacturing, and mining. At the first plan, exports reached to 3.5% and import grew in 6.4% per annum, continuing a failure to adjust the balance of trade that had existed since 1951.

The second and the third plan hoped to enrich the economy at the rate of 4.3% and 6.0%, respectively with agriculture, manufacturing and transportation expected to increase at the rate of 2.5%, 27.3% and 6.7% per annum in the second plan and 2.9%, 14.9%, and 10.9% in the third plan. The Planning Commission did not evaluate these two plans as a result of shortage of qualified personnel. According to the Ethiopian Central Statistical Authority, there was sustainable economic growth in the year of 1960/61 and 1973/1974. Between 1960 and 1970, Ethiopia enjoyed an annual 4.4% growth rate in per capita product and growth domestic product (GDP). The manufacturing sector more than doubled (from 1.9% in 1960/61 to 4.4% in 1973/74), and the growth rate for the wholesale, retail trade, transportation, and communication sectors increased from 9.5% to 15.6%.

References

Further reading
 An Introduction to the Economic History of Ethiopia from Early Times to 1800 by Richard Pankhurst, 1961 

Economy of Ethiopia